Elmer L. Genzmer was a member of the Wisconsin State Assembly.

Biography
Genzmer was born on January 3, 1903, in Mayville, Wisconsin. He would attend the University of Wisconsin–Milwaukee and Marquette University Law School. Genzmer died on December 11, 1977.

Career
Genzmer was a Justice of the Peace in Mayville from 1930 until 1942, when he became Mayor, serving until 1956. He became a member of the Assembly in 1935 and remained a member until 1962. During his time in the Assembly, he changed political parties, leaving the Democratic Party for the Republican Party.

References

People from Mayville, Wisconsin
Wisconsin state court judges
Mayors of places in Wisconsin
Members of the Wisconsin State Assembly
Wisconsin Republicans
Wisconsin Democrats
University of Wisconsin–Milwaukee alumni
Marquette University Law School alumni
1903 births
1977 deaths
20th-century American lawyers
20th-century American judges
20th-century American politicians